The Haninge Ladies Open was a women's professional golf tournament held at Haninge Golf Club near Stockholm in Sweden. The tournament ran for two years on the Swedish Golf Tour before being included on the Ladies European Tour between 1990 and 1996. It was known for sponsorship reasons as the IBM Ladies Open and Trygg Hansa Ladies Open.

Winners

See also
 Scandinavian TPC hosted by Annika

References

External links
Ladies European Tour

Former Ladies European Tour events
Swedish Golf Tour (women) events
Golf tournaments in Sweden